David Higgs is an American organist. He has given a large number of recitals and is the head of the organ department at the Eastman School of Music.

Life 
Higgs earned his B.M. and M.M. at the Manhattan School of Music in New York City, with a Performer's Certificate following from Eastman. He was on the faculty at Manhattan from 1983–86 and was Associate Organist of Riverside Church in New York, where he also conducted the Riverside Choral Society. He then moved to the San Francisco area to join the faculty of the Church Divinity School of the Pacific. In 1992, he moved to Rochester, NY, where he joined the faculty at Eastman. He is now the chair of the Organ and Historical Keyboards Department at Eastman, and continues to serve as a professor of organ.

Discography 
 Bach at Bryn Mawr
 Inaugural Recital (of the Fisk op. 100 at the Meyerson Symphony Center, Dallas)
 Double Forte, with Todd Wilson
 David Higgs at Riverside
 Eastman Italian Baroque Organ, with Hans Davidsson and William Porter
 The Craighead-Saunders Organ, with Hans Davidsson and William Porter

References

External links 
 Publicity page from Karen McFarlane Artists
 Eastman faculty page

American classical organists
American male organists
Eastman School of Music alumni
Living people
Manhattan School of Music alumni
Manhattan School of Music faculty
Place of birth missing (living people)
21st-century organists
21st-century American male musicians
Year of birth missing (living people)
21st-century American keyboardists
Male classical organists